Kelly Jeanne, Hereditary Princess of Saxe-Coburg and Gotha, Duchess of Saxony (born Kelly Jeanne Rondestvedt on January 10, 1975) is an American investment banker. Through her marriage to Hubertus, Hereditary Prince of Saxe-Coburg and Gotha, the heir apparent to the defunct ducal throne of Saxe-Coburg and Gotha, she is a princess of the House of Saxe-Coburg and Gotha.

Early life and family 
Kelly Jeanne Rondestvedt was born on January 10, 1975, in Pensacola, Escambia County, Florida. Her father, Christian Robert Rondestvedt (Massachusetts, 1950/1951), is a retired Captain-Pilot in the United States Navy and her mother, married in San Diego, San Diego County, California, on 7 April 1973 Cheryl Ann Forbes (San Diego, San Diego County, California, 6 February 1951), is a former middle school teacher. She has two younger brothers, Christian and James. She is of Norwegian, English, Scottish, German and French descent. When she was a child, Rondestvedt's family moved to Kings County, California.

Education and career 
She graduated as a salutatorian from Lemoore Union High School in 1993.

Rondestvedt attended the University of California, Los Angeles, and earned a Bachelor of Arts degree in Economics in 1997. After graduating, she began working as an investment banker for PricewaterhouseCoopers in San Diego. She became a California certified public accountant on 6 August 2000. In 2002 she graduated with an Master's Degree in Business Administration from UCLA's Anderson School of Management. In 2007 she began working as an associate for Morgan Stanley before being promoted to vice president.

Marriage and issue 
Rondestvedt met Hubertus, Hereditary Prince of Saxe-Coburg and Gotha, at a restaurant in New York in 2007. They were married in a civil ceremony at Callenberg Castle, Coburg, on May 21, 2009 and again in a Lutheran ceremony at St. Moritz Church in Coburg, Bavaria, on May 23, 2009. There were over 400 wedding guests and 3000 spectators, including King Carl XVI Gustaf and Queen Silvia of Sweden, Lord Nicholas Windsor, Lady Nicholas Windsor, Simeon II of Bulgaria, and Princess Astrid of Belgium, Archduchess of Austria-Este. The couple have three children: 
 Princess Katharina Victoria Elizabeth Cheryl (born April 30, 2014 in Coburg); baptized on September 14, 2014 at Schloss Callenberg. Her godparents are: Crown Princess Victoria of Sweden, Prince Ernst August of Hanover, Duchess Elisabeth in Bavaria, Countess Katharina of Faber-Castell and Prince Konstantin-Assen of Bulgaria.
 Prince Philipp Hubertus Andreas Christian (born July 15, 2015 in Munich); baptized on November 14, 2015 at Schloss Callenberg. His godparents are: King Philippe of Belgium, Countess Alexandra von Schönborn, Bernhard, Hereditary Prince of Baden, Prince Carl von Wrede and Carina Axelsson.
 Princess Madeleine Aurelia Viktoria Carin (born February 22, 2017 in Munich); baptized on July 2, 2017 at Schloss Callenberg. Her godparents are: Georg Friedrich, Prince of Prussia, Princess Anna of Bavaria, Princess Alexandra-Nadejda von Kohary (Mrs. Champalimaud Raposo de Magalhães), Countess Clémence von der Schulenburg and Count Benedikt von Abensperg und Traun.

Titles and styles 
 May 21, 2009 – present: Her Highness The Hereditary Princess of Saxe-Coburg and Gotha

References 

1975 births
Living people
American accountants
American investment bankers
American people of English descent
American people of French descent
American people of German descent
American people of Norwegian descent
American people of Scottish descent
American women bankers
American bankers
American Lutherans
Duchesses of Saxony
Women accountants
Kelly
Princesses of Saxe-Coburg and Gotha
Princesses by marriage
People from Pensacola, Florida
PricewaterhouseCoopers people
Morgan Stanley employees
UCLA Anderson School of Management alumni